José Antonio Chicoy Massa (born 2 November 1947) is a Spanish former swimmer who competed in the 1968 Summer Olympics. He was born in Madrid.

Notes

References

External links
 
 
 
 

1947 births
Living people
Swimmers from Madrid
Spanish male swimmers
Spanish male freestyle swimmers
Olympic swimmers of Spain
Swimmers at the 1968 Summer Olympics
Mediterranean Games medalists in swimming
Mediterranean Games gold medalists for Spain
Mediterranean Games silver medalists for Spain
Swimmers at the 1967 Mediterranean Games